Huntingtown, established 1683, is a census-designated place (CDP) in Calvert County, Maryland, United States. The population was 3,311 at the 2010 census, up from 2,436 in 2000. Many large estate homes have recently been built in small developments off routes 2/4. It has a public high school called Huntingtown High. The Calverton School is located just south of the town center. State-operated commuter buses and private vanpools carry residents to Washington.

Demographics

As of the census of 2000, there were 2,436 people, 768 households, and 668 families residing in the CDP. The racial makeup of the CDP was 79.84% White, 17.04% African American, 0.37% Native American, 0.78% Asian, 0.12% Pacific Islander, 0.29% from other races, and 1.56% from two or more races. Hispanic or Latino of any race were 0.86% of the population.

There were 768 households, out of which 48.6% had children under the age of 18 living with them, 75.5% were married couples living together, 8.5% had a female householder with no husband present, and 13.0% were non-families. 10.3% of all households were made up of individuals, and 4.4% had someone living alone who was 65 years of age or older. The average household size was 3.17 and the average family size was 3.42.

In the CDP, the population was spread out, with 32.1% under the age of 18, 5.2% from 18 to 24, 30.8% from 25 to 44, 24.0% from 45 to 64, and 8.0% who were 65 years of age or older. The median age was 36 years. For every 100 females, there were 97.2 males. For every 100 females age 18 and over, there were 92.0 males.

The median income for a household in the CDP was $81,672, and the median income for a family was $85,907. Males had a median income of $60,362 versus $35,962 for females. The per capita income for the CDP was $28,312. About 4.2% of families and 7.9% of the population were below the poverty line, including 12.7% of those under age 18 and 12.1% of those age 65 or over.

Notable people
 Tom Clancy, author of bestselling political thrillers
 Doug Hill, ABC Channel 7 weatherman
 Harry Krause, baseball Player

References

External links
 Huntingtown High School

Census-designated places in Calvert County, Maryland
Census-designated places in Maryland